Hesham Mustafa (born 1 July 1952) is a former Iraqi football midfielder who played for Iraq in the 1976 AFC Asian Cup.

Hesham played for the national team between 1974 and 1979.

References

Iraqi footballers
Iraq international footballers
1976 AFC Asian Cup players
Living people
1952 births
Association football midfielders